Oramas is a surname of Spanish origin. Notable people with the surname include:

Ana Oramas (born 1959), Spanish politician
Faustino Oramas (1911 - 2007), Cuban singer
Robert Oramas (born 1984), Venezuelan volleyball player

Spanish-language surnames